Qoli Tappeh (also Romanized as Qolī Tappeh; also known as Kālī Tappeh and Kālitepe) is a village in Yanqaq Rural District in the Central District of Galikash County, Golestan Province, Iran. At the 2006 census, its population was 2,660, in 649 families.

References 

Populated places in Galikash County